Maguri Motapung Beel (also known as Maguri Motapung Bill, Maguri Bill and Maguri Beel) is a wetland and lake located near to Dibru-Saikhowa National Park and Motapung Village of Tinsukia district in Assam.  Maguri Motapung Beel serve as natural home to wildlife and provide a source of livelihood to the local communities.

Etmyology
Maguri is the local term for walking catfish and Motapung is the name of the nearby village. Beel or Bill means lake in Assamese language.

Geography
Maguri Motapung Beel is approx. 9 km away from Tinsukia town and 50 km from Dibrugarh Airport. This lake is 3.8 km away from Guijan Ferry Ghat which is the gateway of the Dibru-Saikhowa National Park.  Maguri Motapung Beel is located in the south bank of the Dibru River and it connects Dibru River through a small channel and finally meets Brahmaputra River.

Avifauna

Maguri Motapung Beel is a natural habitat to many varieties of birds. The lake is an important habitat for over 110 resident and migratory bird species, including eight listed as threatened on the IUCN Red List, such as the Swamp grass babbler, the ferruginous duck,  the white-winged wood duck and the falcated duck. 

A rare Mandarin duck was spotted in 2021 in the wetland Maguri Motapung Beel for the first time in 118 years.

See also
List of lakes of Assam

References

Lakes of Assam
Tinsukia district
Important Bird Areas of India